Darcy Connor Lear (7 June 1898 – 20 June 1967) was a former Australian rules footballer who played with Carlton in the Victorian Football League (VFL).

Notes

External links 
		
Darcy Lear's profile at Blueseum

1898 births
Australian rules footballers from Victoria (Australia)
Carlton Football Club players
1967 deaths